The men's artistic gymnastics all-around final at the 2019 European Games was held at the Minsk-Arena on 29 June.

Qualification 

Qualification took place on 27 June. David Belyavskiy from Russia qualified in first, followed by Armenia's Artur Davtyan and Robert Tvorogal of Lithuania.

The reserves were:

Results 
Oldest and youngest competitors

References

Gymnastics at the 2019 European Games